Victor Landim Araújo (born 25 June 1991 in Salvador, Brazil) is a Brazilian footballer who plays as a midfielder.

Career
Araujo moved from his native Brazil to Belgium, playing with R.R.F.C. Montegnée and Eupen, before moving to the United States, playing college soccer at Trinity University in 2013 and 2014.

Araujo played with Premier Development League side Ocean City Nor'easters in 2015.

Araujo signed with United Soccer League side San Antonio FC on February 19, 2016.

References

External links
 

1991 births
Living people
Brazilian footballers
Brazilian expatriate footballers
Expatriate footballers in Belgium
Brazilian expatriate sportspeople in Belgium
Brazilian expatriate sportspeople in the United States
Expatriate soccer players in the United States
Trinity Tigers men's soccer players
R.R.F.C. Montegnée players
K.A.S. Eupen players
Ocean City Nor'easters players
San Antonio FC players
Challenger Pro League players
USL League Two players
USL Championship players
Sportspeople from Salvador, Bahia
Association football midfielders